Al-Lubban al-Gharbi is a Palestinian village in the Ramallah and al-Bireh Governorate, located 21 kilometers northwest of Ramallah in the northern West Bank. According to the Palestinian Central Bureau of Statistics, the village had a population of 1,476 inhabitants in 2007.

Al-Lubban al-Gharbi has a total land area of 9,694 dunams, of which 335 are built-up area. Most of the remaining land is either grown with olive and almond orchards or open for continued expansion of the village. However, the Israeli West Bank barrier will separate 59% of Lubban al-Gharbi's land from the village's urban area. The village's infrastructure facilities include an elementary school a kindergarten, and two clinics.

Location
It is bordered by Bani Zeid and 'Abud to the east, Deir Ballut to the north, Rantis and Israel to the west, and 'Abud to the south.

History
The village is located at an ancient site on the slopes of a hill. 
Potsherds from the IA I-II (apparently the 10th and early 9th centuries B.C.E.), have been found, and from the IA II, Persian, Roman, Byzantine/Umayyad, Crusader/Ayyubid, Mamluk and early Ottoman era.

There are remains of ancient buildings, the stones of which have been reused in some the village's inhabited houses. In the courtyard of the village mosque are the bases of five columns that may have formed part of a chapel. Also in the village are cisterns carved into the rock, and on the slopes of a neighboring hill to the southwest, there are tombs and grottos carved into the rock. The village has been identified with Beit Laban in the Talmud, a place known for its wines.

Al-Lubban al-Gharbi has also been identified with the Crusader Luban, or Oliban, mentioned in connection with nearby Casale St. Maria.

Ottoman era
The village was incorporated into the Ottoman Empire in 1517 with all of Palestine, and in 1596 it appeared in the tax registers under the name Lubban al-Kafr. It was located in the Nahiya of Jabal Qubal, part of Nablus Sanjak, with a population of 29 Muslim households. The villagers paid a fixed tax rate of 33.3% on various agricultural products, such as wheat, barley, summer crops, olives, goats and beehives in addition to "occasional revenues"; a total of 6,954 akçe.

In 1838, it was noted as a Muslim village, Lubban Rentis, in Jurat Merda, south of Nablus.

French explorer Victor Guérin visited the village in 1863, and noted that "The houses appear to be very ancient, and present the particularity that many of them form together a continued whole, as if they were all one house, now divided among separate families. A quantity of ancient materials may be observed in the walls." He further noted that the village had 300 inhabitants.

In 1882 PEF's Survey of Western Palestine (SWP), the village, (called "Lubban Rentis"), was described a being small, and situated on a knoll beside a Roman road.

British Mandate era
In the 1922 census of Palestine conducted by the British Mandate authorities, Lubban had a population 221 inhabitants, all Muslims, increasing in the 1931 census when the village, with the name Al-Lubban or Lubban Rantis, had 60 occupied houses and a population of 298 Muslims.

In the 1945 statistics the population of El Lubban was 340, all Muslims, who owned 9,854 dunams of land according to an official land and population survey. 1,411 dunams were plantations and irrigable land, 1,118 used for cereals, while 6 dunams were built-up (urban) land.

Jordanian era
In the wake of the 1948 Arab–Israeli War, and after the 1949 Armistice Agreements, Al-Lubban al-Gharbi came under Jordanian rule. 

The Jordanian census of 1961 found 602 inhabitants in Lubban.

1967-present
Since the Six-Day War in 1967, Al-Lubban al-Gharbi has been under Israeli occupation.

After the 1995 accords, 2.9% of village land was classified as Area B, he remaining 97.1% as Area C. Israel has confiscated land from Al-Lubban al-Gharbi in order to construct the Israeli settlements of Beit Aryeh and Ofarim.

See also
Al-Lubban ash-Sharqiya

References

Bibliography

External links
Welcome To al-Lubban
Survey of Western Palestine, Map 14:  IAA, Wikimedia commons
     Al Lubban al Gharbi Village (Fact Sheet), Applied Research Institute–Jerusalem, ARIJ
Al Lubban al Gharbi Village Profile, ARIJ
Al Lubban al Gharbi Aerial Photo, ARIJ
Locality Development Priorities and Needs in Al Lubban al Gharbi Village, ARIJ
 Al Lubban Al Gharbi Village feels the threat of the Israeli Segregation Wall 18, March, 2006, ARIJ
Witnessing Israeli violations:" Al-Lubban Al-Gharbi village, Jeet village, Beit Hanina" Proactive Israeli Colonial Escalation before September bid for a Palestinian State 07, September, 2011, ARIJ

Villages in the West Bank
Municipalities of West Bank
Municipalities of the State of Palestine
Ancient Jewish settlements of Judaea